Horstsee is a lake in Stade, Lower Saxony, Germany. At an elevation of 6 m, its surface area is 3.75 ha.

Lakes of Lower Saxony